At the Mountain's Base is a children's book written by Traci Sorell, illustrated by Weshoyot Alvitre, and published September 17, 2019 by Kokila. The book was also published in Cherokee under the title ᎾᏍᎩᏃ ᎤᎾᎢ ᎡᎳᏗᏢ ᎣᏓᎸᎢ, ᎾᎢ.

Reception 
At the Mountain's Base received starred reviews from School Library Journal, Booklist, and Shelf Awareness, as well as positive reviews from Publishers Weekly, American Indians in Children's Literature, and Kirkus.

Bank Street College of Education named At the Mountain's Base one of the best children's books of 2020.

References 

2019 children's books